On the German Baltic Sea island of Rügen there are 49 church buildings, of which 43 are Evangelical, three are New Apostolic and three are Roman Catholic churches. The Rügen Roman Catholic parish, the northernmost in the Archdiocese of Berlin, has its seat in St. Boniface's Church in Bergen auf Rügen. The oldest churches on Rügen date from the 12th century. The most recent churches were built in the 20th century, in order to satisfy the growing demand of the seaside resorts.

Overview map

List of churches 
In many cases it is difficult to give precise information about construction dates, because the churches were converted and extended. The overriding factor is the construction phase in which the building was given its present shape. Earliest recorded dates are usually just a terminus ante quem which only indicates the earliest date when the building must have existed, but not for how long up to that time. Sometimes it is also unclear whether a date refers to the current building or to a predecessor.

The churches marked in bold font in the table are the parish churches of their respective parishes.

Literature 
 Tourismuszentrale Rügen (Herausgeber): Gotteshäuser: Dorf- und Stadtkirchen auf Rügen und in Stralsund, Bergen 2003

External links 

!Rugen
!
 Rugen,churches
Mecklenburg-Western Pomerania-related lists